The Astor Cup Race was an American auto racing event, first run in 1915 at the Sheepshead Bay Speedway at Sheepshead Bay, New York. The winner's trophy was donated by Vincent Astor, whose name and connections ensured the attendance of members of New York City's fashionable and wealthy elite.

1915
Owned by a group of Wall Street and other business investors, including Harry Harkness of Cleveland and Carl G. Fisher of Indianapolis, the Sheepshead Bay Speedway Corporation acquired the defunct horse racing facility known as the Sheepshead Bay Race Track (which had been owned by William Kissam Vanderbilt and Leonard Jerome's Coney Island Jockey Club). The purchase was completed in April 1915 and the first Astor Cup race was held on October 9 that year. Run over a two-mile (3 km) banked oval board track, the  race was marred by the death of Harry Grant who died when his vehicle crashed during a practice run. Won by Gil Andersen in a Stutz, the first Astor Cup drew the top drivers from across the United States and Europe such as Ralph DePalma, Barney Oldfield, Eddie Rickenbacker, Dario Resta, Johnny Aitken and Howdy Wilcox. The winner if the first Astor Cup car race in 1915 was Gil Andersen.

1916
The 1916 race was run on October 30, 1916, with Johnny Aitken winning and setting a speed record at 104 miles per hour.

The race ceased to exist after two years.  Other auto races continued at the track until 1919.  The Sheepshead Bay Speedway Corporation ran into financial difficulties, following the January 1919 death of Harry Harkness.  The property was sold for residential real estate development.

Current usage
The original cup is now held by Indy Racing League, LLC, which is a descendant of Fisher's Indianapolis Motor Speedway, as both are now owned by Roger Penske. Two cylindrical black granite bases have been added displaying the names of all the AAA, USAC, CART, and IRL series winners since 1909, including the winners of the ceremonial Gold Crown championship which only consisted of one race. The two granite bases are not actually attached to the trophy and are rarely seen with it when the trophy tours. This makes it possible for it to be picked up and held by its winner.

Originally announced on October 12, 2011, as the new championship trophy for the IndyCar Series, it was first presented to Dario Franchitti on February 13, 2012, during the organisation's State of INDYCAR address at Hilbert Circle.  The winning driver and team owner are each presented with a scaled replica of the trophy during official INDYCAR business meetings.  Since 2012, the trophy has been presented at the final race of the season.

Race results

IndyCar drivers champions

References

Sources

http://www.champcarstats.com
Galpin, Darren;  A Record of Motorsport Racing Before World War I.
Harry S. Harkness dies of Influenza, The New York Times, January 24, 1919

External links
 Website for the 1915 Astor Cup race & Sheepshead Bay race details  (Site contains newspaper articles and an excellent collection of photos)

Auto races in the United States
Astor family
Motorsport competitions in New York (state)